The 1958 Asian Games, officially the Third Asian Games and commonly known as Tokyo 1958, was a multi-sport event held in Tokyo, Japan, from 24 May to 1 June 1958. It was governed by the Asian Games Federation. A total of 1,820 athletes representing 20 Asian National Olympic Committees (NOCs) participated in the Games. The program featured competitions in 13 different sports encompassing 97 events, including four non-Olympic sports, judo, table tennis, tennis and volleyball. Four of these competition sports – field hockey, table tennis, tennis and volleyball – were introduced for the first time in the Asian Games.

This is the first time that Japan hosted the Asian Games.

Background
The Asian Games is a multi-sport event, much like the Summer Olympics (albeit on a much smaller scale), with participation exclusively for Asian countries. The first edition was held in the capital city of India, New Delhi, in 1951, attracting 489 competitors from 11 nations.

Sports
The programme for the Tokyo 1958 Games included 13 different sports divided into 97 events. Four of these sports – judo, table tennis, tennis and volleyball – were not on the official Olympic sports programme at that time. Badminton was added as a demonstration sport, which, from 1962 onwards, became a regular competitive sport in the Asian Games. Judo was another demonstration sport.

Torch relay
The tradition of torch relay, inspired by the Olympic Games, was introduced for the first time in the Asian Games in 1958. The relay officially began from the main venue of the Second Asian Games, Rizal Memorial Coliseum, in Manila, Philippines. In the host nation, Japan, it was relayed from Okinawa to Kyushu Island. Okinawa was under the United States administration at that time. At the opening ceremony, the Games cauldron was ignited by the first Japanese Olympic gold medallist and the first Asian Olympic champion in an individual event, Mikio Oda.

Participating nations

A record total of 1,820 athletes representing 20 member nations of the Asian Games Federation participated in the Games. The number of participating countries was also greatest in comparison to the first two editions of the Games.
 
The Thai delegation held a meeting on 22 May 1958 in Tokyo, and invitations were sent to the representatives of Malaysia, Burma and Laos. The agenda of the meeting was to discuss the possibility of forming a regional multi-sport event on the lines of Asian Games for the countries of Southeast Asia. This way the Southeast Asian Peninsular Games (SEAP Games), which later became the Southeast Asian Games, were established and the first SEAP Games were held in Bangkok, Thailand, in 1959.

Opening ceremony
The opening ceremony of the Tokyo 1958 Games was organised on 24 May 1958 at the National Olympic Stadium. The ceremony, among other dignitaries and guests, included the Emperor of Japan Hirohito, crown prince Akihito and Shah of Iran Mohammad Reza Pahlavi. Around 70,000 people attended the opening ceremony.

Calendar
In the following calendar for the 1958 Asian Games, each blue box represents an event competition, such as a qualification round, on that day. The yellow boxes represent days during which medal-awarding finals for a sport were held. The numeral indicates the number of event finals for each sport held that day. On the left, the calendar lists each sport with events held during the Games, and at the right, how many gold medals were won in that sport. There is a key at the top of the calendar to aid the reader.

Medal table

Athletes from 16 countries won medals, leaving four countries without a medal, and 11 of them won at least one gold medal. Afghanistan, Cambodia, Nepal and North Borneo did not win any medal. The Japanese 4 × 100 metres medley relay team of Keiji Hase (backstroke), Masaru Furukawa (breaststroke), Manabu Koga (freestyle) and Takashi Ishimoto (butterfly) won the gold medal with a time of 4:17.2 and broke the world record.

The ranking in this table is consistent with International Olympic Committee convention in its published medal tables. By default, the table is ordered by the number of gold medals the athletes from a nation have won (in this context, a nation is an entity represented by a NOC). The number of silver medals is taken into consideration next, followed by the number of bronze medals. If nations are still tied, equal ranking is given; they are listed alphabetically by IOC country code.

The top ten ranked NOCs at these Games are listed below. The host nation, Japan, is highlighted.

References

External links
 Olympic Council of Asia
 Japanese Olympic Committee

 
Asian Games
Asian Games
A
Asian Games by year
Sports competitions in Tokyo
Multi-sport events in Japan
Asian Games
Asian Games
Asian Games
Asian Games